Antonio Garbasso (16 April 1871 – 14 March 1933) was an Italian physicist and National Fascist Party politician. He was the 14th mayor and the 1st podestà of Florence, Kingdom of Italy.

Principal works
Sulla luce polarizzata circolare e particolarmente sulla sua velocità nei mezzi dotati di potere rotatorio magnetico, Tip. Guadagnini, Torino, 1892
Sulla luce bianca, pubbl. su "Atti della R. Acc. delle Scienze di Torino", vol. XXX, 16 dic.1894
Sopra i raggi del Rontgen (con A. Battelli), pubbl. su "Nuovo Cimento", S.4, vol. III, genn.1896
Raggi catodici e raggi X (con A. Battelli), pubbl. su "Nuovo Cimento", S.4, vol. III, maggio 1896
Su la polarizzazione rotatoria dei raggi di forza elettrica, pubbl. su "Nuovo Cimento", S.5, vol. IV, settembre 1902
Teoria elettromagnetica dell'emissione della luce, pubbl. su "Mem. della R. Acc. delle Scienze di Torino", S. II, T.LIII, 6 febbr. 1903
L'aereo Artom e la dirigibilità delle onde elettriche, Vincenzo Bona, Torino, 1909
Su la teoria degli spettri a doublets, pubbl. dell'Ist. di Fisica della R. Università di Genova, Pisa, 1909
Fisica d'oggi, filosofia di domani, Libreria ed. milanese, Milano, 1910
Scienza e poesia a cura di J. De Blasi, prefazione di B. Mussolini, Firenze 1934.

References

Bibliography
Mille anni di scienza in Italia

External links
Pagina su Antonio Garbasso (Università di Pisa)
Lezioni sperimentali sulla luce considerata come fenomeno elettromagnetico (1898)
Ulteriori informazioni nella scheda sul database dell'Archivio Storico del Senato, I Senatori d'Italia

1871 births
1933 deaths
20th-century Italian politicians
Mayors of Florence
Kingdom of Italy (1861–1946)
National Fascist Party politicians
19th-century Italian physicists
20th-century Italian physicists